Albert John Stokes [born Albert John Stocek] (January 1, 1900 – December 19, 1986) was a backup catcher in Major League Baseball who played from  through  for the Boston Red Sox. Listed at 5' 9", 175 lb., Stokes batted and threw right-handed. He was born in Chicago, Illinois.

In a two-season career, Stokes was a .181 hitter (25-for-138) with 14 runs and seven RBI in 47 games, including three doubles, and four triples without any home runs.

Stokes died at the age of 86 in Grantham, New Hampshire while visiting his daughter from his home in Wilton, Connecticut.

See also
1925 Boston Red Sox season
1926 Boston Red Sox season

References

External links

Retrosheet

Boston Red Sox players
Major League Baseball catchers
1900 births
1986 deaths
Baseball players from Chicago
People from Wilton, Connecticut